The Dead is a 2016 gothic novel by the Swiss writer Christian Kracht, his fifth novel when it was released. It is set in the film industry at the end of the Weimar era and tells the story of a (fictional) Swiss director, Emil Nägeli, and a Japanese government official (Masahiko Amakasu) who try to create a collaboration between German and Japanese cinema. The plot centers around the May 15 Incident.

The narrative is structured like a Noh play with three acts. The language is inspired by the works of Thomas Mann, with many archaic words and expressions. As in all historiographic metafiction, there are historic characters acting out of time and character – one of the protagonists is a highly unsympathetic Charlie Chaplin, while there are longer appearances by Lotte Eisner, Ernst Hanfstaengel, Siegfried Kracauer and Fritz Lang.

In telling the story of cinema’s development from silent to sound film, the novel considers the issue of "performance" – both in terms of individual identity and the social norms that represent the background to the performing of this identity.

Publication
The book was published on 8 September 2016 through Kiepenheuer & Witsch in Cologne. The cover art for the original German edition features the 1926 painting Night Rain on Shinohashi Bridge by the Japanese print artist Hasui Kawase.

An English translation by Daniel Bowles was published on 17 July 2018 through Farrar, Straus and Giroux. American hardcover first editions feature a George Hurrell portrait of Jean Harlow on the cover. Greek, Russian, Swedish, Danish, Polish, French and Norwegian translations have been published, while Korean, Italian, Albanian, Latvian, Japanese and Mongolian translations are in preparation.

Reception
Bookforum writes: "The Dead reads like a reboot of J. G. Ballard’s Crash, in a treatment by Wes Anderson, after a weekend spent binge-watching John Schlesinger’s version of The Day of the Locust. The result draws out a comically bleak but shakily ambiguous vision of the coming image-world of fascist politics and Tinseltown productions, and of how both authorized a new power of the screen in startlingly effective ways.", while the Los Angeles Review of Books writes: "Across [The Dead], Kracht leaves clues and tracks (perhaps traps) for the readers to connect (or tumble into), eschewing certainty through deliciously stimulating ambiguity in a remarkable, elegiac, sensual, often grotesque and hilarious novel." and the Times Literary Supplement notes "The Dead is wholly unpredictable...and politically astute."

Accolades
The book received the 2016 Swiss Book Prize and the 2016 Hermann-Hesse-Preis. It was nominated for the Bavarian Book Prize.

See also
 Cinema of Germany
 Cinema of Japan

References

External links
 German publicity page 
 American publicity page

2016 novels
German-language novels
Kiepenheuer & Witsch books
Novels about film directors and producers
Novels by Christian Kracht
Novels set in Berlin
Novels set in Japan
Swiss novels
Japan in non-Japanese culture